Kingston Hospital is in Kingston upon Thames, England.

Kingston Hospital may also refer to:
 HealthAlliance Hospital (formerly The Kingston Hospital), Kingston, New York, U.S.
 Kingston General Hospital, Kingston, Ontario, Canada
 Kingston General Hospital, Kingston upon Hull, England (closed)
 Princess Royal Hospital, Kingston upon Hull, England (closed)
 Kingston Public Hospital, Kingston, Jamaica

See also
 List of places called Kingston